Ko Ko...Koli Kothi is a 2012 Kannada romantic film genre starring Srinagar Kitty and Priyamani in the lead roles. The film is directed by R. Chandru. Ramana Gogula is the music director of the film. Bhaskar and Adhi have jointly produced the venture under Bharani films.

Cast 
 Srinagar Kitty as Kitty
 Priyamani as Cauvery
 Srihari as Sri Hari Prasad
 Anu Prabhakar
 Rangayana Raghu
 Harshika Poonachha
 Sanjjanaa Galrani
 Mithra
 Ravi Kale
 Varada Reddy
 Praveen

Soundtrack 
The audio soundtrack was released on 7 December 2011 at the Bell Hotel in Bangalore. Ramana Gogula has composed 6 songs and Kaviraj has penned lyrics for 5 of them.

Release
Ko Ko had a good opening all over Karnataka. It successfully ran in theaters and finished in 30 days. When Sidlingu and Ko Ko was released together, Sidlingu did not get good response due to illegal activities used in the film.

Reception

Critical response 

A critic from The New Indian Express wrote "Priyamani looks apathetic towards her assignment but excels in dance sequences. Sanjana too showed off her moves. Bullet Prakash, as a prospective groom, has the potential to make your funny bones tickle. Music director Ramana Gogula has done a neat job. It is worth a watch provided you have the patience". Shruti I. L. from DNA wrote "He tickles your funny bone right from the beginning. Popular musician Ramana Gokula has scored the music. But none of his songs linger on. Ko Ko is your mundane commercial potboiler. It brings with it a few twists and turns but it’s not too long before you figure out what’s awaiting you at the end of the road".

References

2012 films
2010s Kannada-language films
Films directed by R. Chandru